Kareem Daniel is an American former media executive and was most recently the chairman of the Media and Entertainment Distribution (DMED) division of The Walt Disney Company. He previously served as President of Disney Consumer Products, Games and Publishing and as Chief of Staff to the Office of the CEO of The Walt Disney Company. Prior to that, Daniel also served as President of Business Operations, Product Creation, Games, and Publishing for Walt Disney Imagineering.

Early life and education
Kareem Daniel grew up on the South Side of Chicago. He attended Morgan Park Academy, where he graduated as the high school valedictorian.
He went on to earn both a degree in electrical engineering and an MBA from Stanford University. He then worked as an associate at Goldman Sachs before moving to the Walt Disney Company.

Career with the Walt Disney Company
Daniel has had numerous positions in the Walt Disney Company. He originally started out as an MBA intern. Then he worked as a Senior Business Planner, rising to become Director of Corporate Strategy, where he facilitated numerous mergers and acquisitions. He also served as Vice President of Distribution Strategy at Walt Disney Studios. Daniel worked on Disney's acquisition of Marvel in 2009.

Daniel then moved to Walt Disney Imagineering; he first served as Executive Vice President of Global Business Operations, but in 2019, he was promoted to President of WDI Business Operations, Product Creation, Games, and Publishing.

In May 2020, Daniel was named President of Consumer Products, Gaming and Publishing.

In October 2020, Kareem Daniel was promoted to Chairman of Disney Media & Entertainment Distribution.

In November 2022, he was dismissed from his role amid the firing of then CEO, Bob Chapek.

Personal life
Kareem Daniel attends the Sundance Film Festival in Utah each year.

References

External links
 Disney Leaders: Kareem Daniel
 Blooomberg: Disney's Kareem Daniel Rises From an Intern to Streaming Czar
 Newsweek: Who is Kareem Daniel?
 Morganpark Academy: Alumni Spotlight: Kareem Daniel '92

African-American business executives
Businesspeople from Chicago
Disney executives
Living people
Stanford Graduate School of Business alumni
Year of birth missing (living people)